Piku is a 2015 Indian Hindi-language comedy-drama film directed by Shoojit Sircar and produced by N. P. Singh, Ronnie Lahiri and Sneha Rajani. It stars Deepika Padukone as the titular protagonist, Amitabh Bachchan and Irrfan Khan, with Moushumi Chatterjee and Jisshu Sengupta portraying supporting roles. The script was written by Juhi Chaturvedi. Principal photography began in August 2014 and was wrapped up in December. Anupam Roy composed the soundtrack and score, and wrote the lyrics.

Piku was released on 8 May 2015. The film is loosely based on the 1980 Bengali-language short film, Pikoo by Satyajit Ray. It garnered widespread critical acclaim upon release, with praise for its screenplay, humour and overall simplicity, and particular praise directed towards Padukone, Bachchan and Khan's performances, thus proving to be a milestone in their respective careers. It also emerged as a commercial success worldwide.

At the 61st Filmfare Awards, Piku received 8 nominations, including Best Film, Best Director (Sircar), and Best Actor (Bachchan) and won 5 awards, including Best Actress (Padukone). Bachchan won his record-setting fourth National Film Award for Best Actor at the 63rd National Film Awards and his record-setting third Filmfare Award for Best Actor (Critics) for his performance in the film.

Plot 
Piku Banerjee is an architect residing in Delhi with her 70-year-old widowed father, Bhashkor. Bhashkor is a hypochondriac with chronic constipation, who traces every problem to his bowel movements. His habits often lead to quarrels with Piku, the servants, and Chhobi Mashi, Piku's maternal aunt, who often visits them. Piku loves her father and, as her mother is deceased, takes good care of him but is often extremely irritated by his eccentricities. Her colleague, Syed Afroz is a good friend, and she is a regular client of Syed's friend, Rana Chaudhary's taxi business. Regularly stressed both by her job and by her father's finicky behavior, Piku often quarrels with Rana's taxi drivers during her morning commute, leading to several car crashes.

Piku wants to sell their ancestral home in Kolkata, Champakunj, but Bhashkor objects vehemently and decides to visit Kolkata. Piku, unwilling to let him travel alone after a recent health scare, is obliged to accompany him. Bhashkor refuses all modes of travel other than by car, citing his constipation as the reason. Due to Piku's problems with Rana's employed drivers, all of them refuse to drive her. Piku tries to book a flight to Kolkata but Rana arrives at their home to take the family to Kolkata himself, without informing his mother and sister about the trip.

On the way, the group encounters many incidents, with Rana on the verge of losing patience due to Bhashkor's fussiness and constipation. When they reach Kolkata,  Bhashkor asks Rana to stay with them for some time. Piku and Rana spend time with each other in the city and gradually grow close. Rana also subtly hints at her not to sell the ancestral house.

Rana leaves Kolkata and asks Bhashkor to stop his eccentricities which he eventually listens to. Piku changes her mind and decides not to sell the house. Meanwhile, Bhashkor's sudden desire to bicycle increases as he cycles through a part of the city alone, leaving everyone tense since he did not tell them about it. When Bhashkor returns, Piku berates him for eating street food and for being irresponsible, but he simply states that his constipation is cleared and he needs to bicycle every day. He remembers Rana who had told him to eat everything and not be choosy and picky about food. Piku is secretly happy but does not emote much.

The next day, everyone discovers that Bhashkor has died in his sleep, probably from sleep apnea or cardiac arrhythmia. Piku states that he always wanted a peaceful death. She returns to Delhi, where she arranges his funeral. There, Dr. Srivastava, Bhashkor's doctor, reveals to her that Syed, too, has constipation and Bhashkor knew about it for a long time. A few days later, she pays up whatever due she owes Rana. She renames the Delhi house "Bhaskor Villa" in her father's memory and the maid, who had left due to Bhashkor's tantrums, returns to work. The film ends with a scene of Piku playing badminton with Rana in the courtyard in front of her house.

Cast 
 Deepika Padukone as Piku Banerjee
 Amitabh Bachchan as Bhashkor Banerjee
 Irrfan Khan as Rana Chaudhary
 Moushumi Chatterjee as Chhobi Mashi
 Jisshu Sengupta as Syed Afroz
 Avijit Dutt as Bodo Mesho
 Balendra Singh as Budhan
 Swaroopa Ghosh as Moni Kaaki
 Raghuvir Yadav as Dr. Srivastava
 Aniruddha Roy Chowdhury as Nabendu
 Rupsa Banerjee as Eisha
 Oindrila Saha as Nisha
Sumanto Chattopadhyay as Saurob
 Akshay Oberoi as Aniket (cameo appearance)

Production

Casting 
Shoojit Sircar's original choices of the main cast were Parineeti Chopra in the title role, Amitabh Bachchan and Irrfan Khan. These three actors were given the script. However, Chopra turned down the part. The cast of Deepika Padukone,  Amitabh Bachchan and Irrfan Khan was finalised in mid-2014. In preparation for the role of Piku, Padukone learned Bengali as her character is from Bengal. There were early reports that Jisshu Sengupta was cast as the romantic lead opposite Deepika Padukone, but Sengupta plays Padukone's character's best-friend. Irrfan Khan plays the romantic lead opposite Deepika Padukone. Bachchan essays the role of Piku's father, while Moushumi Chatterjee portrays Piku's maternal aunt. Akshay Oberoi was cast in a cameo.

Filming 
Principal photography for Piku began in August 2014, when the film's first schedule took off in Kolkata. The first schedule for Piku was also filmed in Delhi and Mumbai and included indoor scenes. The second schedule of filming started on 30 October 2014 in Kolkata, mostly in the north. Specifically, shooting took place at the Howrah Bridge in the city's Shyambazar neighbourhood and at Bishop Lefroy Road. During the shooting at Howrah Bridge, Bachchan bicycled around the city dressed as his character. The Kolkata schedule was completed on 18 November 2014 and shooting now shifted to Delhi and Patdi Near Surendranagar in Gujarat.

The "Journey Song" was shot in Gujarat in December 2014 on the state highway connecting Ahmedabad to Bhuj. Shooting in Delhi took place at Gurgaon cyber hub and city club where Padukone and Khan were seen filming. The film was wrapped up after its last schedule shot in Varanasi. Padukone and Khan shot on the ghats of Banaras under chilly conditions and attracted a crowd. Shoojit Sircar said Piku was not written with an interval in mind, but because of the tendency of Indian theatre operators to force intervals into films during screenings, Sircar decided to accommodate an interval during the editing stage.

Music

The music of the film is composed by Anupam Roy while the lyrics are penned Anupam Roy and Manoj Yadav. The first song, "Journey Song", was released on 1 April 2015. The official music album was released online on April 21, 2015.

Marketing
The makers of the film released a video of day one on the sets of Piku which is called Piku Begins. The video has the cast speak about what viewers can expect from the film. As a part of promotions, the makers released on-set pictures of the shooting where the main cast are seen in character. Bachchan's first look was revealed — depicting his character of an old Bengali man with long hair and a big belly. On 25 March 2015, as part of the promotion, Deepika revealed the poster of the film through her Twitter handle.

Reception

Box office
Piku grossed  in India on its opening day. On Saturday, the film earned , showing a growth of 65%. Internationally, Piku had the biggest opening weekend for a Hindi film of 2015, earning over US$2 million. Box Office India reported that the film had a "very strong hold" on its first Monday in India, earning , and it eventually earned  at the end of its first week. In ten days, the film earned  in India. The film earned  in its second week, and Box Office India projected that the film would earn around  domestically at the end of its theatrical run.

Critical response
The film received widespread critical acclaim upon its release.

On review aggregator website Rotten Tomatoes the movie has an approval score of 89% on the basis of 19 reviews with an average rating of 7.4 out of 10.

Raja Sen of Rediff.com gave Piku 4.5 out of 5 stars, writing that it is a "film with tremendous heart -- one that made me guffaw and made me weep and is making sure I'm smiling wide just thinking about it now -- but also a sharp film, with nuanced details showing off wit, progressive thought and insightful writing". In a 4 out of 5 star review, The Times of India praised the writing, direction and performances. Pratim D. Gupta of The Telegraph India gave an average of 7/10, saying "Don’t go in with a lot of laugh-out-loud expectations and you will enjoy Piku for what it is –– a simple, slice-of-life bittersweet tale about a family fighting constipation". Gayatri Sankar of Zee News gave 4 out of 5 stars and wrote "In totality, Piku is a wonderful family film, which will certainly make you wear a broad smile."  Taran Adarsh of Bollywood Hungama gave the film 3.5 stars out of 5 and said "On the whole, Piku is a must watch this season as it brings back the memories of the legendary directors Hrishikesh Mukherjee, Basu Chatterjee and likes".

Rajeev Masand of CNN-IBN gave 4 stars out of five and said "Piku, directed by Shoojit Sircar, is a charming, unpredictable comedy that – like Sircar's Vicky Donor – mines humor from the unlikeliest of places". Anuj Kumar of The Hindu gave it a positive review, saying "A slice of life that deals with the practical difficulties in loving your aging parents in a light-hearted, feel good way, Piku is a progressive piece of cinema that brings the parent back into the picture". Sweta Kaushal of Hindustan Times praised the portrayal of a strong, independent female protagonist and noted on how well Sircar presents a "realistic view of a typical Indian family". Anupama Chopra gave 4 out of 5 stars and said "Piku is a delightful film about very little and yet it says so much. This isn't a movie focused on reaching a destination. This is a movie about the journey, both literal and emotional". Saibal Chatterjee of NDTV gave 3.5 stars out of 5 and called it a "magnificently original film that delivers a memorably unique movie experience" and praised the performance of the three leads. Tanmaya Nanda of Business Standard praised the film for its feminist tone and its unique approach in dealing with scatological humour. Namrata Joshi of Outlook gave 3 out of 5 stars, and wrote "Piku goes into an atypical zone for a Hindi mainstream film. It breaks the plot-driven, high on drama rule and yet manages to forge a big connect with the audience; The slice-of-life film has characters, relationships and interactions that feel real and evoke empathy in viewers—be they aging parents or their caregivers".

On the contrary, Shubhra Gupta of The Indian Express gave 2.5 out of 5, saying "Piku sparks in moments, and I threw my head back and guffawed in a few. But the rest of it stays only mildly amusing. I wanted more motion in these motions". Rachel Saltz of The New York Times wrote "Piku, directed by Shoojit Sircar from a script by Juhi Chaturvedi, isn't a typical Hindi movie. It lopes along, following no formula beyond the roughest outlines of a romantic comedy."

In 2019, Film Companion ranked Padukone's performance among The 100 Greatest Performances of the Decade.

Accolades

References

External links 
 
 
 
 

2015 films
2010s Hindi-language films
2010s road comedy-drama films
Films directed by Shoojit Sircar
Films scored by Anupam Roy
Films shot in Kolkata
Films shot in Delhi
Indian road comedy-drama films
Films featuring a Best Actor National Award-winning performance
Films whose writer won the Best Original Screenplay National Film Award
Films whose writer won the Best Dialogue National Film Award
Sony Pictures Networks India films
Films distributed by Yash Raj Films
Features based on short films
Sony Pictures films
Columbia Pictures films
Indian drama road movies